Yei is a city in South Sudan.

YEI or Yei  may also refer to:
 Yei or yeii, is a Navajo or Zuni deity-like spirit often portrayed in artworks such as sandpaintings or weavings
 Yei River State, a state in South Sudan
 Yei language, a Papuan language of Papua New Guinea
 YEI, the IATA airport code for Yenişehir Airport
 Quasipaa yei, a species of frog  in the family Ranidae
 Yei Theodora Ozaki, an early 20th-century translator  of Japanese short stories and fairy tales

See also 
 Yey (disambiguation)